The men's 96 kilograms competition at the 2021 World Weightlifting Championships was held on 13 and 14 December 2021.

Schedule

Medalists

Records

Results

New records

References

Results

Men's 96 kg